Shane Waldron (born August 17, 1979) is an American football coach who is the offensive coordinator for the Seattle Seahawks of the National Football League (NFL). He previously served as an assistant coach for the Los Angeles Rams, Washington Redskins and New England Patriots.

Early years
Waldron attended La Salle High School in Portland, Oregon. After a year at Phillips Academy in Andover, Massachusetts, he played college football at Tufts University as a tight end and long snapper from 1999 through 2002.

Coaching career

New England Patriots
Starting in 2002, Waldron served as an operations intern for the New England Patriots for two seasons before being promoted to operations assistant in 2004, where he handled special teams quality control duties and oversaw the completion of the weekly game plans.

Notre Dame Fighting Irish
From 2005 to 2007, followed Patriots offensive coordinator Charlie Weis to the University of Notre Dame to serve as a graduate assistant.

New England Patriots
Waldron was rehired by the New England Patriots and worked under head coach Bill Belichick, also a Phillips Academy alumnus, as offensive quality control coach in 2008. He was promoted to  tight ends coach for the 2009 season.

Hartford Colonials
He left the Patriots after the 2009 season and joined the Hartford Colonials of the United Football League as their wide receivers coach in 2010.

UMass Minutemen
After spending 2011 at the Buckingham Browne & Nichols School, Waldron moved to the University of Massachusetts and was the recruiting coordinator and tight ends coach from 2012 to 2013 before being promoted to offensive line coach from 2014 to 2015.

Washington Football Team
In 2016, Waldron was hired by the Washington Football Team as an offensive quality control coach.

Los Angeles Rams
On February 2, 2017, Waldron was hired to be the tight ends coach for the Los Angeles Rams, under new head coach Sean McVay.

On January 30, 2018, Waldron was  named passing game coordinator, after Matt LaFleur became offensive coordinator for the Tennessee Titans. Head coach Sean McVay promoted offensive line coach Aaron Kromer to run game coordinator and Waldron to passing game coordinator in order to help fill the void. In 2019, Waldron was promoted to quarterbacks coach after Zac Taylor was named head coach of the Cincinnati Bengals.

Seattle Seahawks
On January 26, 2021, Waldron was hired by the Seattle Seahawks as their offensive coordinator under head coach Pete Carroll, replacing Brian Schottenheimer.

References

External links
 Seattle Seahawks profile

1979 births
Living people
American football tight ends
American football long snappers
Hartford Colonials coaches
Los Angeles Rams coaches
New England Patriots coaches
Notre Dame Fighting Irish football coaches
Tufts Jumbos football players
UMass Minutemen football coaches
Washington Redskins coaches
Phillips Academy alumni
Players of American football from Portland, Oregon
Sportspeople from Portland, Oregon
National Football League offensive coordinators 
Seattle Seahawks coaches
Wikipedia pages semi-protected against vandalism
Wikipedia semi-protected pages